The Devil Drives is the sixth album by Dave Graney 'n' The Coral Snakes. It was released in May 1997 on Mercury Records. The album peaked at No. 18 on the Australian Recording Industry Association (ARIA) Album Charts. It was also produced by Dave Graney, Clare Moore and David Ruffy. The album was recorded in August 1996 in Kiss Studios, Melbourne and mixed in October 1996 at London at Matrix Maison Rouge studios.

The singles from the album were, "Feelin Kinda Sporty" in April, and "A Man on the Make" in September. The album was also accompanied by a media CD with an interview with Dave Graney called Coffins Have No Pockets.  This was part of a media booklet based on a Holden Monaro owners manual in a plastic booklet/folder. The single won 'Best Video' by Mahony in 1997, the album was nominated for 'Best Cover Art' by Mahony and Graney received a nomination as 'Best Male Artist'. It was the last studio album with the Coral Snakes and with Universal Music as the group disbanded in December.

Title concept 
The name of the album follows the old proverb "Needs must when the devil drives", in which drive is a reference to coercing or (figuratively) pushing.  However, the imagery of the album is suggestive of a literal interpretation of the devil driving (piloting) a car.

Reception

Professional reviews
See table.

Track listing
 "The Oblivion Seekers" - 3:57
 "My Only Regret (I Opened My Mouth)" - 4:25
 "I Don't Know You Exist" - 4:15
 "Rackin' Up Some Zeds" - 4:25
 "Everybody Loves a Mass Killer" - 4:52
 "I Dig the Pioneers" - 3:50
 "The Sheriff of Hell" - 4:58
 "Pianola Roll" - 3:16
 "Land of the Giants" - 5:24
 "I Love Your Gravity" - 4:48
 "Biker in Business Class" - 4:29
 "A Man on the Make" - 4:11
 "Pascal et Caroline" - 6:41
 "The Devil Drives" - 3:59
 "Feelin' Kinda Sporty" - 3:11

Personnel

Musicians
 Andy Baldwin - violin
 Rebecca Barnard - backing vocals
 Gordy Blair - bass, backing vocals 
 Robin Casinader - piano, organ, violin, backing vocals 
 Dave Graney - vocals, acoustic guitar
 Rod Hayward - guitar, backing vocals 
 Clare Moore - drums, percussion, organ, vibraphone, vocals 
 David Ruffy - sampler (programming, edits, loops)
 Liduina Van Der Sman - flute, backing vocals

Production details
Engineer - Kenny Jones 
Engineer Assistant - Sean Thompson 
Engineer - Andy Baldwin 
Mixer - David Ruffy 
Producer - Dave Graney, Clare Moore, David Ruffy 
Studio - Kiss, Melbourne (recording) Matrix Maison Rouge, London (Mixing)

Artwork
Cover art - Tony Mahony

References

1997 albums
Dave Graney 'n' the Coral Snakes albums
Mercury Records albums